Nazaret is a variant of Nazareth in many languages and a given name and surname. Notable people with the name include:

Nazaret Daghavarian (1862–1915), Armenian Ottoman doctor, agronomist and public activist, and one of the founders of the Armenian General Benevolent Union
Magno Nazaret (born 1986), Brazilian professional racing cyclist

See also
Nazar (given name)
Nazareth (disambiguation)

Spanish feminine given names
Armenian masculine given names
Spanish unisex given names